The women's 50 metre freestyle S6 event at the 2012 Paralympic Games took place on 4 September, at the London Aquatics Centre.

Three heats were held, with even swimmers at each. The swimmers with the eight fastest times advanced to the final.

Heats

Final

References

Swimming at the 2012 Summer Paralympics
2012 in women's swimming